The Upper Kotmale Dam (also known as the Upper Kotmale Hydropower Project, or UKHP) is located in Talawakele, within the Nuwara Eliya District, in the Central Province of Sri Lanka. The dam feeds the third largest hydroelectric power station in the country.

History 

The project was initially planned in 1968 by the local authorities, before the Government of Japan funded a study between 1985 and 1987 to further examine the hydroelectric potential in the upper reaches of Kotmale River. The feasibility study included five sites and eight alternative development schemes, and concluded with two sites which were more technically and economically feasible.

The two sites were a conventional type at Caledonia, and a run-of-the-river type at Talawakele. The project at Caledonia involved the displacement of over 2,700 families and inundation of large areas of land used for tea plantations, and thus the Caledonia site was dropped. Further funding was then provided by Japan for the engineering study, which included a review of the feasibility study, selection of an optimal development plan, development of the detailed design, and the preparation of tender documents and an environmental impact assessment report.

The environmental impact assessment report was completed in September 1994, with the final design report completed in March 1995. The environmental assessment identified key issues associated with the project, which includes impact on St. Clair's Falls aesthetics due to stream flow reductions, social impacts due to resettlement of affected people, possible effects on ground water due to tunnelling, impacts on downstream water uses due to de-watering of streams, and impacts on biodiversity. These impacts led large delays in project development.

As per the National Environmental Act of 1998, the environmental clearance was then granted to the project. The project initially faced several objections, before being officially permitted by courts of law. Construction work on the project then began in 2006, and is expected to be completed by the end of 2011.

Construction and development 
This project is estimated to cost a total of up to Rs.44 billion, of which Rs.5.931 billion was funded by the Ceylon Electricity Board, and ¥33.265 billion by the Japan Bank for International Cooperation.

 Phase 1: Site preparations, construction of employers and workers living quarters, construction of access roads, and relocation of affected people.
 Phase 2: All key civil engineering works, such as construction of tunnel, dam, underground power house etc. This takes about 50% of the project cost.
 Phase 3: Hydro-mechanical works such as construction of spillways, penstocks, intake gates, etc.
 Phase 4: Electro-mechanical works such as generation installations, construction of the switchyard, fire fighting system, communication system, etc.
 Phase 5: Construction of the   double-circuit power transmission line.
A total of 2,250 construction workers are employed at the site, of which 2,100 are locals, and 150 are foreign.

Dam and reservoir 

Water from the reservoir will be used for both irrigation development and hydroelectric power generation.

Tunnel 

Excavation on the tunnel was completed and ceremonially opened by President Mahinda Rajapaksa on 4 November 2010.

Powerhouse 

The initial  of the penstock is single-lane, while the latter  splits into two lanes, feeding the two  generators respectively.

The powerhouse consists of the two three-phase ,  vertical-axis Francis turbine-generators, two three-phase transformers, and a 220kV Gas Insulator Switchgear (GIS) substation.

Transmission line 
The 220kV transmission line of the Upper Kotmale Hydro-power Project connects the power station located at Niyamgamdora, Kotmale, to the national grid via Kotmale switch yard located in Atabage, Gampola. The line consists of 45 towers and has a length of 15.5 km. The double circuit transmission line has a capacity of 220 MW per circuit.

Social and environmental impact 

The construction of the dam, tunnel, and powerhouse, required the relocation of families from 495 houses. New homes were built away from the site with access to vital facilities such as water and power. The relocated families are provided with concessionary loans to start new self-employment ventures, while additional facilities such as the Talawakele Central College, places of worship, a cinema hall, a library, and a community centre, are being established.

See also 

 Electricity in Sri Lanka
 Kotmale Dam
 List of dams and reservoirs in Sri Lanka
 List of power stations in Sri Lanka

References 

2012 establishments in Sri Lanka
Buildings and structures in Nuwara Eliya District
Dams completed in 2012
Dams in Sri Lanka
Gravity dams
Hydroelectric power stations in Sri Lanka